Love Is Like a Butterfly is the fourteenth solo studio album by American entertainer Dolly Parton. It was released on September 16, 1974, by RCA Victor.  The title track was the third consecutive single to reach #1 on the U.S. country charts for Parton. For the few years before her pop chart success, "Butterfly" was considered Parton's signature song and was used as the theme song for her 1976 syndicated music series Dolly!. The album peaked at # 7 on the country albums charts. The album was rereleased on iTunes in March 2014 the same day as her 2014 album Blue Smoke was made available for pre-order.

Critical reception
In a positive review of the album, Billboard said, "Beginning with her beautiful hit single, Miss Parton sings a variety of songs which demonstrate her stature in this business. It's an outstanding album, full of great songs, most of which she wrote herself, and covering a great many subjects. Some are ballads, some up-tempo, and she handles everything with grace." The review noted "If I Could Cross Your Mind", "Gettin' Happy", and "Once Upon a Memory" as the best tracks on the album. The review concluded with a note to record dealers, saying that the album has "an outstanding cover, which merits prominent display."

Another positive review of the album from Cashbox said, "Whether with Porter or by herself the inimitable songbird Dolly Parton will have an avid following [in] whatever she chooses to do or whomever she chooses to sing with. Her voice is light, airy, and deliciously unique. She has a vocal style and timbre that truly set her apart from the other female contenders. The collection of material is representative and Dolly carries all the tunes off with superb excellence. Included with the title track which is her present charted single is "If I Cross Your Mind" that is a ballad of prime degree exemplifying Dolly's very special warble. The review noted "Take Me Back", "Sacred Memories", and "Blackie, Kentucky" as the best tracks on the album.

Track listing
All songs are written by Dolly Parton, except where indicated.

References

External links
Love Is Like a Butterfly at Dolly Parton On-Line

Dolly Parton albums
1974 albums
Albums produced by Bob Ferguson (music)
RCA Records albums